Thomas and Lydia Gilbert Farm, also known as the Datestone Farm, is a historic home and farm located at Holicong, Buckingham Township, Bucks County, Pennsylvania. The original section of the farmhouse was built in 1711, with additions made in 1735 and 1812.  Each section is marked with a datestone.  The house consists of two -story, stone sections with a unifying cornice, roofline, and slate-covered gable roof. It is in a vernacular Georgian style. The house was restored in 1970–1972. and a frame addition completed on the west side of the house.  Also on the property are a contributing stone and frame bank barn, stone and frame wagon house (c. 1840), and a stone spring house with a datestone of 1808.

It was added to the National Register of Historic Places in 1989.

References

Houses on the National Register of Historic Places in Pennsylvania
Georgian architecture in Pennsylvania
Houses completed in 1812
Houses in Bucks County, Pennsylvania
National Register of Historic Places in Bucks County, Pennsylvania